Arctesthes siris is a moth of the family Geometridae. It is endemic to New Zealand.

Taxonomy

This species was first described by George Vernon Hudson in 1908 under the name Lythria siris. He based his description on specimens discovered by J. H. Lewis at approximately 1200 metres in altitude in the Old Man Range of Central Otago.

Distribution and habitat

A. siris is only found in alpine areas of Otago where it prefers wetland areas and snow banks.  It has been observed at altitudes of 1300 – 1500 metres. The species has been recorded in the Lammermoor Range, the Old Man and the Rock and Pillar ranges.

Life stages

A. siris is a day flying moth and has been observed as an adult in February.

Host species

The host species for A. siris include mat-forming Coprosma species.

References

External links

 Citizen science observations of species
 Specimens held at the Auckland War Memorial Museum

Moths of New Zealand
Larentiinae
Moths described in 1908
Endemic fauna of New Zealand
Taxa named by George Hudson
Endemic moths of New Zealand